Zohuki or Zahooki or Zehuki may refer to:
 Zohuki, Bandar Abbas
 Zehuki, Minab